Apostle Peter and the Last Supper is a 2012 film directed by Gabriel Sabloff and starring Robert Loggia, Ryan Alosio, Bruce Marchiano, Lawrence Fuller, Sarah Prikryl and Bill Oberst Jr.

The film was written by Timothy Ratajczak and Gabriel Sabloff.

Plot
The film portrays Saint Peter (Alosio as the younger and Loggia as the elder) reflecting on his time with Jesus (Marchiano) and his fellow Apostles during his final imprisonment in Rome at the Mamertine Prison. In particular, Peter attempts to convert one of his jailers, Martinian (Fuller), by relating the life, teachings, and sacrifice of Jesus.

Cast
 Robert Loggia as Elderly Peter
 Ryan Alosio as Peter 
 Bruce Marchiano as Jesus
 Sarah Prikryl as Novella
 Laurence Fuller as Martinian
 David Kallaway as Processus
 Leon Melas as Andrew 
 David Collier as Judas
 Russell Wolfe as John
 Emilio Doorgasingh as Thomas
 Sean Savage as James the Greater
 Kevin Hoffman as Phillip
 Tom Konkle as Matthew
 Bill Oberst Jr. as The Demon
 Adamo Palladino as Gallus

References

External links 
 
 Review by Dove Foundation
 Official trailer for film

2012 films
American drama films
2010s English-language films
Films based on the Gospels
Pure Flix Entertainment films
Films about Christianity
Last Supper
Cultural depictions of Saint Peter
Films produced by Russell Wolfe
Portrayals of Jesus in film
Cultural depictions of Judas Iscariot
2012 drama films
Films set in ancient Rome
Films produced by David A. R. White
2010s American films